USS Frederick Luckenbach was a cargo ship that served in the United States Navy from 1918 to 1919.

Frederick Luckenbach was built as a commercial cargo ship in 1888 at South Shields, England, by J. Readhead and Company. She operated under the names SS Charters Towers and SS San Mateo, and by the time the U.S. Navy acquired her at Cardiff, Wales, for World War I service on 2 October 1918 she was named SS Frederick Luckenbach. On 5 October 1918 she was commissioned as USS Frederick Luckenbach.

Frederick Luckenbach carried coal for use by the United States Army from Cardiff and Belfast, Ireland, to French ports until 20 March 1919, when she sailed from Cardiff for New York City. She was decommissioned at New York on 7 May 1919 and returned to her owner.

Unlike most commercial ships commissioned into U.S. Navy service during World War I, Frederick Luckenbach never received a naval registry Identification Number (Id. No.).

References

NavSource Online: Section Patrol Craft Photo Archive: Frederick Luckenback

World War I cargo ships of the United States
Ships built on the River Tyne
1888 ships
Cargo ships of the United States Navy